Parasites Like Us (2003) is American author Adam Johnson's debut novel. In the novel, anthropologist Dr. Hannah and his graduate students uncover a Clovis burial site, only to usher in the end of civilization.

The book won a silver medal for fiction at the 2004 California Book Awards.

References

2003 American novels
2003 speculative fiction novels
2003 debut novels